Quo Vadis is an Italian film directed by Enrico Guazzoni for Cines in 1913, based on the 1896 novel of the same name written by Henryk Sienkiewicz. It was one of the first blockbusters in the history of cinema, with 5,000 extras, lavish sets, and a lengthy running time of two hours, setting the standard for "superspectacles" for decades to come.

A worldwide success, it premiered in Germany at the opening night of the Ufa-Pavillon am Nollendorfplatz (Berlin's first purpose-built, free-standing cinema), on 19 March 1913. In an unusual departure from normal cinematic practice, the crowd scenes were reinforced with "special mobs" of live costumed actors in the auditorium.

Quo Vadis was the first film to be projected in the Astor Theatre, a first-class theater on Broadway, where it was screened for nine months from April to December 1913. The film's first screening in London was for King George V, in the Royal Albert Hall, who complimented the performers.

Plot
The story is set during the latter years of the reign of the emperor Nero. Marcus Vinicius, one of Nero's military officers, falls in love with a young Christian hostage named Lygia. But their love is hindered by Nero, who has his soldiers burn Rome and pins the blame on the Christians. Nero launches a cruel persecution of the religious sect, who are sentenced to death in the Circus. Among the victims is Lygia. She is tied to the back of a bull in imitation of Europa. But her life is saved by her bodyguard Ursus, who wrestles the bull to death.

Cast

Other versions
 1901 film directed by Lucien Nonguet and Ferdinand Zecca
 1924 film directed by Gabriellino D'Annunzio and Georg Jacoby, produced by Arturo Ambrosio
 1951 film directed by Mervyn LeRoy
 1985 TV mini-series directed by Franco Rossi
 2001 film directed by Jerzy Kawalerowicz
 2002 TV series (6 ep.) directed by Jerzy Kawalerowicz

Removal from U.S. distribution
When the 1924 version was issued, to prevent theatres from showing the 1913 film in competition, the Unione Cinematographica Italiana purchased all rights to the performance of 1913 film in the United States and Australia, including the existing inventory of film prints, stills, posters, and glass slides, from George Kleine, who had obtained the U.S. rights back in 1913.

See also
 Quo Vadis, the novel (1896) by Henryk Sienkiewicz

References

Notes
  The Peplum in the days of silent cinema, 1, ch. of "Cinema Peplum" Dominic Cammarota, "Future essays" n. 14, and. Fanucci, '87, p. 15th
  The Dictionary of film Mereghetti-2002-cards, ed. Baldini & Castoldi, 2001, p. 1711.

External links

 
 
 
 Post cards with stills at filmstarpostcards.blogspot.com

1913 films
Articles containing video clips
Films based on works by Henryk Sienkiewicz
Films set in ancient Rome
Films set in the 1st century
Films set in the Roman Empire
Italian cinema articles by quality
Italian epic films
Italian silent feature films
Depictions of Nero on film
Cultural depictions of Poppaea Sabina
Italian black-and-white films
Cultural depictions of Saint Peter
Films directed by Enrico Guazzoni
Silent adventure films